The 2008 United States presidential election in New York took place on November 4, 2008, and was part of the 2008 United States presidential election. Voters chose 31 representatives, or electors to the Electoral College, who voted for president and vice president.

New York was won by Democratic nominee Barack Obama with a 26.9% margin of victory. Obama took 62.88% of the vote to McCain's 36.03%. At the time this was the highest Democratic vote share in New York State since 1964, although Obama would outperform his 2008 showing in New York just four years later in 2012. Prior to the election, all 17 news organizations considered this a state Obama would win, or otherwise considered as a safe blue state. Located in the Northeast, a region of the country that is trending heavily towards the Democrats, elections in the Empire State are dominated by the presence of the heavily populated, heavily diverse, liberal bastion of New York City where Democrats are always favored to win. Obama became the first Democrat to win the White House without carrying Montgomery County since Jimmy Carter in 1976.

, this is the last election in which Chautauqua County voted for the Democratic candidate.

Primaries
 2008 New York Democratic presidential primary
 2008 New York Republican presidential primary

Campaign

Predictions 
There were 16 news organizations who made state-by-state predictions of the election. Here are their last predictions before election day:

Polling

Obama won all but one pre-election poll. Since September 15, Obama won each poll with a double-digit margin of victory and each with at least 55% of the vote. He won the final Marist poll with a 36-point spread. The final 3 polls averaged Obama leading 63% to 31%.

Fundraising
John McCain raised a total of $12,582,856 in the state. Barack Obama raised $58,161,743.

Advertising and visits
Obama and his interest groups spent $1,148,016. McCain and his interest groups spent just $7,310. The Republican visited the state 11 times and the Democratic ticket visited the state 4 times.

Analysis

New York was once reckoned as a powerful swing state with a slight Democratic lean. However, the last time the state went Republican was for Ronald Reagan in 1984. Michael Dukakis narrowly won it against George H. W. Bush in 1988, but the state has not been seriously contested since then. It is now considered an uncontested blue state, and was heavily favored to vote for Obama by a significant margin.

Elections in the Empire State are dominated by the presence of New York City, a Democratic stronghold for more than a century and a half. It is made up mostly of white liberals as well as ethnic and religious minorities—all voting blocs that strongly vote Democratic. Obama won Manhattan, Brooklyn and the Bronx by margins of 5-to-1 or more and carried Queens by a 3-to-1 margin. The only borough McCain carried was Staten Island, traditionally the most conservative area of the city. Obama's combined million-vote margin in the Five Boroughs would have been enough by itself to carry the state.

However, Obama also dominated heavily Democratic Western New York, including Buffalo and Rochester, and the Capital District (Albany, Schenectady and Troy), as well as the increasingly Democratic Long Island and Syracuse areas. Even when New York was considered a swing state, a Republican had to carry Long Island and do reasonably well in either Western New York, the Capital District or Syracuse to make up for the massive Democratic margins in New York City. Obama also won a number of traditionally Republican-leaning counties in Upstate New York and became the first Democrat since Lyndon B. Johnson to win an outright majority of votes in the Upstate (although Democratic candidates had been consistently winning pluralities of the vote since 1992). Barack Obama dominated in fiercely Democratic New York City, taking 2,074,159 votes to John McCain's 524,787, giving Obama a 79.29% - 20.06% landslide victory citywide. Excluding the votes of New York City, Obama still would have carried New York State, but by a smaller margin. Obama would have received 2,730,786 votes to McCain's 2,227,984, giving Obama a 55.06% - 44.93% victory. 

At the same time, Democrats in New York picked up three seats in the U.S. House of Representatives in 2008. In the 13th district, which consists of Staten Island and part of Brooklyn, Democrats picked up an open seat that was vacated by former Republican Vito Fossella who resigned after he was arrested for getting a DUI. Democrat Michael McMahon solidly defeated Republican Robert Staniere by a two-to-one margin, 60.79-33.26%. His victory made the city's delegation entirely Democratic for the first time in over 70 years.  In the 25th district, centered around Syracuse, Democrat Dan Maffei handily defeated Republican Dale Sweetland 55% to 42% for the open seat vacated by Republican Jim Walsh.  In New York's 29th congressional district, which includes Canandaigua, Democrat Eric Massa narrowly defeated incumbent Republican Randy Kuhl by 1.7 points. This reduced the Republicans to only three of the state's 29 seats in the House—the fewest the GOP has ever won in an election. At the state level, Democrats picked up a seat in the New York State Assembly and two seats in the New York State Senate which gave Democrats control of the Senate and ultimately both chambers of the New York Legislature for the first time since 1965. This gave the Democrats complete control of New York's state government for the first time since 1936.

Results

By county

Counties that flipped from Republican to Democratic 

 Dutchess (County Seat: Poughkeepsie)
 Orange (County Seat: Goshen)
 Rockland (County Seat: New City)
 Saratoga (County Seat: Ballston Spa)
 Cayuga (County Seat: Auburn)
  Chautauqua (County Seat: Mayville)
 Cortland (County Seat: Cortland)
 Essex (County Seat: Elizabethtown)
 Otsego (County Seat: Cooperstown)
 Seneca (County Seat: Waterloo)
 Sullivan (County Seat: Monticello)
 Oswego (County Seat: Waterloo)
 Washington (County Seat: Hudson Falls)
 Madison (County Seat: Wampsville)
 Warren (County Seat: Queensbury)

By congressional district
Barack Obama swept 26 of the state's 29 congressional districts in New York, including two districts held by Republicans. John McCain carried 3 districts, including two district that simultaneously elected Democrats.

Electors

Technically the voters of New York cast their ballots for electors: representatives to the Electoral College. New York is allocated 31 electors because it had 29 congressional districts under the 2000 Census and 2 senators. All candidates who appear on the ballot or qualify to receive write-in votes must submit a list of 31 electors, who pledge to vote for their candidate and their running mate. Whoever wins the majority of votes in the state is awarded all 31 electoral votes. Their chosen electors then vote for president and vice president. Although electors are pledged to their candidate and running mate, they are not obligated to vote for them. An elector who votes for someone other than their candidate is known as a faithless elector.

The electors of each state and the District of Columbia met on December 15, 2008, to cast their votes for president and vice president. The Electoral College itself never meets as one body. Instead the electors from each state and the District of Columbia met in their respective capitols.

The following were the members of the Electoral College from the state. All 31 electors were pledged to Barack Obama and Joe Biden:
Velda Jeffrey
June O'Neill
Dennis Mehiel
David Paterson
Andrew Cuomo
Thomas DiNapoli
Sheldon Silver
Malcolm Smith
Maria Luna
Robert Master
Pamela Green-Perkins
Helen D. Foster
Jon Cooper
Hakeem Jeffries
Richard Fife
Deborah Slott
Terrence Yang
George Arthur
George Gresham
Alan Van Capelle
Inez Dickens
Suzy Ballantyne
Alan Lubin
Bethaida Gonzalez
Christine Quinn
William Thompson
Stuart Applebaum
Maritza Davila
Ivan Young
Barbara J. Fiala
Frank A. Bolz

See also
 United States presidential elections in New York
 Presidency of Barack Obama

References

2008
New York
2008 New York (state) elections